Chen Lei (born October 16, 1985 in Shanghai) is a professional Chinese football player who currently plays for Shanghai Jiading Huilong in the China League One.

Club career 
Chen Lei made first competitive debut for Shanghai Shenhua in April 2006, aged 20 in a 1-0 defeat against Shenzhen Kingway. By the end of the season he was able to make four appearances for Shanghai, however at the beginning of the 2007 league there was an influx of players with the merger Shanghai United F.C. and Chen Lei went out on loan to Changchun Yatai for two seasons. At Changchun Yatai he gained considerably more playing time and helped the team to claim their first league title in his first season with them. He would return to Shanghai Shenhua at the beginning of the 2009 Chinese Super League season where he would gradually push for a place within the first team playing as a full back until Sun Xiang returned to the team after his loan move in Europe ended. After only making six league appearances Chen Lei was loaned out once more to this time Shenzhen Asia Travel until the end of the season. At the beginning of the 2010 league season Chen would return to Shanghai once his loan ended and claim his place back into the team due to the departure of Sun Xiang leaving the club. Chen transferred to another China League One club Chongqing Lifan in January 2014.

International career
Chen Lei would make his debut in a friendly against Iran on 1 June 2009 in a 1-0 win, coming on as a substitute for Rong Hao.

Career statistics 
Statistics accurate as of match played 31 December 2020.

Honours

Club
Changchun Yatai
Chinese Super League: 2007

Chongqing Lifan
China League One: 2014

References

External links 
 Player profile at football-lineups.com
 Player profile at Shanghai Shenhua website
 Player stats at sohu.com
 
 

1985 births
Living people
Chinese footballers
Footballers from Shanghai
China international footballers
Shanghai Shenhua F.C. players
Changchun Yatai F.C. players
Shenzhen F.C. players
Dalian Professional F.C. players
Chongqing Liangjiang Athletic F.C. players
Chinese Super League players
China League One players
Association football defenders
21st-century Chinese people